Legendary Whitetails is a clothing company that designs and sells everyday apparel, gifts, and gear related to deer hunting. Legendary Whitetails was established in 1999 as a direct-to-consumer catalog and internet retailer, and is headquartered in Apopka, Florida.

History 
Legendary Whitetails was founded in 1999 by Larry Huffman, a hunter and conservationist.

Founder Larry Huffman died in 2007. 

In 2019, the company filed for Chapter 128 Receivership in Washington County Circuit Court on March 4. The company was sold and operations moved to Florida in May 2019.

Products 
The Legendary Whitetails brand was established with the release of the 1999 catalog, deeming product as the “Original Deer Gear”.  The catalog, along with the ecommerce website are the primary channels of business. The product line included a men's line, women's line, kids’ apparel, Big and Tall sizing, footwear, home, hunting, and auto product categories.

The Hunt Bum apparel line was added in 2013 and was designed specifically for active outdoorsmen.

As of 2014, the women's line was the fastest growing segment of Legendary Whitetails.

Achievements 
In 2013, Legendary Whitetails won the Outstanding Employer Award, given by the Wisconsin Rehabilitation Association's Job Placement and Development Board.

See also
 Cabelas
 Bass Pro Shops
 Dick's Sporting Goods
 Gander Mountain
 Lands' End
 REI
 Sportsman's Warehouse
 The Sportsman's Guide

References

External links 
 Legendary Whitetails
 Legendary Whitetails Community Blog

Deer hunting
Online clothing retailers of the United States
Companies based in Wisconsin
Companies based in Orange County, Florida
Apopka, Florida
Mail-order retailers
Camouflage
Washington County, Wisconsin
American companies established in 1999
Retail companies established in 1999
1999 establishments in Wisconsin